The Big Gundown is an album by American composer and saxophonist/multi-instrumentalist John Zorn. It comprises radically reworked covers of tracks by the Italian film composer Ennio Morricone.

The album is named after a 1966 Spaghetti Western of the same name, directed by Sergio Sollima, starring Lee Van Cleef, and scored by Morricone. The album was first released in 1985 on the Nonesuch/Icon label. In 2000 a remastered 15th Anniversary Edition with additional tracks was released on CD on Zorn's Tzadik Records label.

In 1985 Zorn had been working in New York City's experimental music scene for almost a decade (the album was originally to be called "Once Upon a Time in the Lower East Side"), but The Big Gundown launched him to wider prominence. In the notes for the 2000 reissued CD, Zorn describes The Big Gundown as representing a creative breakthrough as well for being the first time he worked extensively with multi-track recording, overdubbing and ornate orchestration. Though his main instrument is alto sax, Zorn did not play on most tracks, adding only a few touches of piano, game calls, harpsichord or musical saw.

Reception 

The AllMusic review by Scott Yanow awarded the album 4 stars stating "There are certainly no dull moments on this often-riotous program".

The Penguin Guide to Jazz selected this album as part of its suggested "Core Collection" and awarded it a "crown", calling it "utterly remarkable in every way and one of the essential records of the '80s".

The Rolling Stone review by Steve Futterman was less enthusiastic, and Futterman stated, "Despite high-spirited contributions from a first rate cast, Zorn's tentative and analytical remakes tend to bleed Morricone's high drama and joyous kitschiness dry".

Track listing 
 "The Big Gundown" - 7:26
 "Peur sur la Ville" - 4:16
 "Poverty (Once Upon a Time in America)" - 3:49
 "Milano Odea" - 3:02
 "Erotico (The Burglars)" - 4:27
 "Battle of Algiers" - 3:50
 "Giu la Testa (Duck You Sucker!)" - 6:06
 "Metamorfosi (La Classe Operaia Va In Paradiso)" - 4:37
 "Tre nel 5000" - 4:37
 "Once Upon a Time in the West" - 8:44
 The album was re-released and remastered in 2000, with six newly recorded tracks:
11. "The Sicilian Clan" - 3:20
12. "Macchie Solari" - 3:29
13. "The Ballad of Hank McCain" - 5:27
14. "Svegliatti & Uccidi" 3:03
15. "Chi Mai" - 3:06
16. "The Ballad of Hank McCain (instrumental)" - 5:28

All compositions by Ennio Morricone except "Tre nel 5000" by John Zorn

Personnel 

 Orvin Aquart – harmonica
 Cyro Baptista – cuíca
 Joey Baron - drums
 Tim Berne – alto saxophone
 Laura Biscotto – sexy Italian vocals
 Vicki Bodner – oboe, English horn
 Polly Bradfield – violin
 Anthony Coleman – piano, harpsichord, organ, vocals
 Trevor Dunn - bass guitar
 Carol Emanuel – harp
 Reinaldo Fernandes – repinique
 Anton Fier – drums
 Duduka Da Fonseca – caixa
 Bill Frisell – electric guitar
 Fred Frith – electric guitar, bass guitar
 Diamanda Galás – vocals
 Melvin Gibbs – electric bass guitar
 Jody Harris – electric guitar
 Shelley Hirsch – vocals
 Wayne Horvitz – piano, celeste, electronic keyboards
 Bob James – tapes
 Guy Klucevsek – accordion
 Arto Lindsay – batucada contractor, electric guitar, vocals
 Christian Marclay – turntables
 Mark Miller – drums, timpani
 Big John Patton – organ
 Mike Patton - vocals
 Bobby Previte – drums, percussion, timpani, vocals
 Robert Quine – electric guitar
 Vernon Reid – electric guitar
 Ned Rothenberg – shakuhachi, ocarina, jaw harp
 Michihiro Sato – tsugaru shamisen
 Luli Shioi – vocals
 Claudio Silva – pandeiro
 Jorge Silva – surdo
 Jim Staley – trombone, bass trombone
 Toots Thielemans – whistling, harmonica
 David Weinstein – Mirage, microcomputer
 John Zorn – alto saxophone, saw, vocals, harpsichord, game calls, piano
 Martin Bisi - extra recording/engineering

References 

John Zorn albums
Nonesuch Records albums
Tzadik Records albums
Covers albums
Ennio Morricone albums